Hypatius may refer to:

 Hypatius of Gangra or Hypatius the Wonderworker, 4th-century bishop and saint
 Hypatius (consul 359)
 Hypatius of Bithynia (died 450 circa), 5th-century monk
 Hypatius (consul 500)
 Hypatius of Ephesus (fl. c. 530), metropolitan of Ephesus
 For the 1st-century saint, see Leontius, Hypatius and Theodulus